The following is a list of episodes of Lost Tapes, a thriller horror docudrama television series that airs on the Animal Planet channel.  Each episode is either "TV-PG" followed by V or L, or "TV-14" followed by V or L. The plot of each episode is described, below, using in-universe tone.

Series overview

Season 1 (2008–2009)

Season 2 (2009)

Season 3 (2010)

Lost tapes